Harold Lee may refer to:
 Harold B. Lee (1899–1973), eleventh president of The Church of Jesus Christ of Latter-day Saints
 Harold Lee (character), fictional character in the Harold & Kumar film series
 Harold Lee, cowboy featured in Death in the West (1983), who was dying of lung cancer from smoking when interviewed 
 Hal Lee (1905–1989), baseball player
 Harold Lee Hsiao-wo (1910–1980), founders and first chairman of Television Broadcasts Limited (TVB)

See also
 Harry Lee (disambiguation)